Myepic is a South African band featuring singer Jeff Strodl, bassist Matthys Cronje, lead guitarist JP Sing and percussionist Jonathan Jackson.

The band's debut full-length album, The Love Industry, was released on Murdercall Records under their original name Myepic. It was produced by Hanu de Jong of The Narrow. Two years later a seven-track EP, Happiness Hurts, followed on Sheer Sound. It was produced by SAMA-winner Neal Snyman and included the Springbok Nude Girls. Lyrically this material was darker, encapsulating various challenges and temptations faced by band members and their rock 'n roll lifestyle.

A life worth livin''', produced in-house by Grant Bez, offers a new name with a new sound and direction: their present-day motto is "Stop trying to be cool and just have fun." They announced that it would be the last album released on CD, as they believe the way forward is singles and digital.

Highlights of the band's career include touring Germany in 2006, opening for Seether at the Standard Bank Arena in 2008, studio experiences at MK's Studio 1, and touring with South African stalwarts The Parlotones. In 2010 Kahn Morbee provided additional vocals on the track "Don't You Love Dancing". "Make up your mind" was written by Jay Bones from Fuzigish, with Strodl, who wanted to experiment with different styles of songwriting and learn something. The band played live on an internet broadcast to fans around the world on the 1st season of SkyRoomLive in 2012.

 Releases 

Myepic released their debut full-length album The Love Industry on Murdercall Records in 2006 and a 7-track EP Happiness Hurts'' on Sheer Sound in 2008.

Band members 

 Jeff Strodl – lead vocals, guitar
 Matthys Cronje – bass guitar
 JP Sing – guitar
 Jonathan Jackson – Drums
 Kerran Yates – drums (2010–2012)
 Grant Bez – guitar, Vocals (2006–2011)
 Janlo van den Heefer – drums (2007–2009)

References 

 Myepic on Facebook
 Music on Soundcloud
 Interview on 24.com

South African hard rock musical groups
South African rock music groups